Sindia is an arrondissement of M'bour in Thiès Region in Senegal.

References 

Arrondissements of Senegal